The women's heptathlon at the 2012 European Athletics Championships was held at the Helsinki Olympic Stadium on 29 and 30 June.

Lyudmyla Yosypenko of Ukraine originally came second with 6416 points and was awarded the silver medal, but she was disqualified for doping in 2013, after her biological passport profile showed she'd been blood doping. All her results from 25 August 2011 onwards were annulled.

Laura Ikauniece (silver) and Aiga Grabuste (bronze) received their medals by mail.

Medalists

Records

Schedule

Results

100 metres hurdles
Wind:Heat 1: -1.1 m/s, Heat 2: +0.3 m/s, Heat 3: +0.4 m/s

High jump

Shot put

200 metres
Wind:Heat 1: 0.0 m/s, Heat 2: -0.5 m/s, Heat 3: -0.4 m/s

Long jump

Javelin throw

800 metres

Final standings

References

 100 m H results
 High jump results
 Shot put results
 200 m results
 Long jump results
 Javelin results
 800 m results
 Final results
Full results

Heptathlon
Combined events at the European Athletics Championships
2012 in women's athletics